Harry Scott may refer to:

 Harry Scott (ice hockey) (1885–1954), ice hockey player
 Harry Scott (boxer) (1937–2015), British boxer
 Harry J. Scott, founding editor of the Dalesman magazine
 Tup Scott (1858–1910), Australian cricket captain
 Harry Scott (footballer, born 1897) (1897–1970), English footballer for Sunderland
 Harry Scott (footballer born 1908) (died 1989), English footballer with Bournemouth and Swindon Town, see Jack Scott
 Harry Albert Scott, Canadian ambassador for Cuba preceding Hector Allard
 Harry Scott (1879–1947), one half of the comedy minstrel duo Scott and Whaley

See also
 Henry Scott (disambiguation)
 Harold Scott (disambiguation)